37th Street is a street in Austin, Texas, known for its many houses that are decorated with Christmas lights. The tradition attracts tens of thousands of visitors each year, though neighbor participation has decreased the past few years due to the original residents having moved away and more students renting homes in the neighborhood.

History
In the mid-1980s, a couple of neighbors began bridging the street with Christmas lights left by other neighbors and found at fraternity and sorority houses near the University of Texas. Soon, other neighbors followed suit. Early participant Bob Godbout recalled, "It didn't start out as Christmas lights. It started out as a wild art form and stayed that way."

In 1993, city workers removed lights strung from city poles due to fire hazard concerns. In response, street residents turned off all lights, resulting in numerous complaints directed at the city from visitors expecting light displays. City workers returned the following day to reinstall the lights.

See also

 Christmas decoration
 Christmas lighting technology
 Christmas market

References

External links

 Texas Less Traveled: Light Up Your Life... The Miracle of 37th Street
 Video: "37th Street Lights Shining Bright" (KTBC)
 Fans of 'Stranger Things' have to check out 37th Street in Austin, KVUE

Christmas in Texas
Culture of Austin, Texas
Winter traditions